Jasper Maskelyne (29 September 1902 – 15 March 1973) was a British stage magician in the 1930s and 1940s. He was one of an established family of stage magicians, the son of Nevil Maskelyne and a grandson of John Nevil Maskelyne. He is most remembered for his accounts of his work for the British military during the Second World War, in which he claimed to have created large-scale ruses, deception, and camouflage in an effort to defeat the Nazis.

Early life
Maskelyne was born in Wandsworth, London, England in 1902, to magician Nevil Maskelyne and his wife Ada Mary Ardley.

Career

Stage magician

Maskelyne was a successful stage magician. His 1936 Maskelyne's Book of Magic describes a range of stage tricks, including sleight of hand, card and rope tricks, and illusions of "mind-reading".

In 1937, Maskelyne appeared in a Pathé film, The Famous Illusionist, in which he performed his well-known trick of appearing to swallow razor blades.

Wartime service

Maskelyne joined the Royal Engineers when the Second World War broke out, thinking that his skills could be used in camouflage. According to one story, he convinced skeptical officers including inspector of training  Viscount Gort by camouflaging a machine gun position in plain sight and creating the illusion of the German warship Graf Spee on the Thames using mirrors and a model.

Maskelyne was trained at the Camouflage Development and Training Centre at Farnham Castle in 1940. He found the training boring, asserting in his book that "a lifetime of hiding things on the stage" had taught him more about camouflage "than rabbits and tigers will ever know". The camoufleur Julian Trevelyan commented that he "entertained us with his tricks in the evenings" at Farnham, but that Maskelyne was "rather unsuccessful" at actually camouflaging "concrete pill-boxes".

Brigadier Dudley Clarke, the head of the 'A' Force deception department, recruited Maskelyne to work for MI9 in Cairo. He created small devices intended to assist soldiers to escape if captured and lectured on escape techniques. These included tools hidden in cricket bats, saw blades inside combs, and small maps on objects such as playing cards.

Maskelyne was then briefly a member of Geoffrey Barkas's camouflage unit at Helwan, near Cairo, which was set up in November 1941. He was made head of the subsidiary "Camouflage Experimental Section" at Abbassia. By February 1942 it became clear that this command was not successful, and so he was "transferred to welfare"—in other words, to entertaining soldiers with magic tricks. Peter Forbes writes that the "flamboyant" magician's contribution was

His nature was "to perpetuate the myth of his own inventive genius, and perhaps he even believed it himself". However, Clarke had encouraged Maskelyne to take credit for two reasons: as cover for the true inventors of the dummy machinery and to encourage confidence in these techniques amongst Allied high command.

Maskelyne's book about his exploits, Magic: Top Secret, ghost-written, was published in 1949. Forbes describes it as lurid, with "extravagant claims of cities disappearing, armies re-locating, dummies proliferating (even submarines)—all as a result of his knowledge of the magic arts". Further, Forbes notes, the biography of Maskelyne by David Fisher was "clearly under the wizard's spell". In his book, Maskelyne claims his team produced

Doubts raised
A study by Richard Stokes argues that much of the story concerning the involvement of Maskelyne in counterintelligence operations as described in the book Magic: Top Secret was pure invention and that no unit called the "Magic Gang" ever existed. According to Stokes, Maskelyne's role in the war was marginal.

Christian House, reviewing Rick Stroud's book The Phantom Army of Alamein in The Independent, describes Maskelyne as "one of the more grandiose members" of the Second World War desert camouflage unit and "a chancer tasked with experimental developments, who fogged his own reputation as much as any desert convoy".

David Hambling, writing on Wired, critiques David Fisher's uncritical acceptance of Maskelyne's stories: "A very colourful account of Maskelyne's role is given in the book The War Magician—reading it you might think he won the war single-handed". Hambling denies Maskelyne's supposed concealment of the Suez Canal: "[I]n spite of the book's claims, the dazzle light[s] were never actually built (although a prototype was once tested)".

In the book on WW2 deception, Ghosts of the ETO, Jonathan Gawne argued that Maskelyne was not responsible for all the deception work he claimed and that Dudley Clarke deserved the lion's share of credit. In 2002 The Guardian wrote: "Maskelyne received no official recognition. For a vain man this was intolerable and he died an embittered drunk. It gives his story a poignancy without which it would be mere chest-beating".

Later life and death
After the war, Maskelyne resumed his magic career. In 1950, he moved to Africa, where he developed his show into a touring performance that traveled between South Africa and British possessions in East Africa. He eventually settled in Nairobi, where he founded a successful driving school. During the Mau Mau Uprising, Maskelyne led a mobile squad of police. In addition, he managed the Kenya National Theatre. Maskelyne died in Nairobi on 15 March 1973.

Family
On 24 June 1926 Maskelyne married Evelyn Enid Mary Home-Douglas (died 24 March 1947), who had worked as a magician's assistant in his stage show. They were the parents of two children, son Alistair (1927-2019) and daughter Jasmine (born 1928), who was known as "Bobbie". On 11 March 1948 Maskelyne married Evelyne Mary Scotcher, who was known as Mary.

Possible film adaptations
In 2003, director Peter Weir and actor Tom Cruise were working on a film based on The War Magician. When questions rose about how much of The War Magician was factual and how much was invented by the author, the project was dropped while still in pre-production.

In 2015 Benedict Cumberbatch was reported as signing on to play the lead role in a Maskelyne film. At the time, the project was pending the selection of a director.

In 2021, it was announced that Colin Trevorrow would direct War Magician, with Cumberbatch as the star.

Works

References

Sources

External links
 Jasper Maskelyne, The War Magician. (Critique by Richard Stokes)
 'Deceptionists at War', Jonathan Allen, Cabinet, issue 29, 2007

1902 births
1973 deaths
British magicians
British Army personnel of World War II
Royal Engineers officers
Camoufleurs
British emigrants to Kenya
People from Wandsworth
Deaths in Kenya